The Mittagskogel (German) or Kepa (Slovenian) has an elevation of  aA, and is thus the third highest mountain in the Karawanks range, after Hochstuhl/Stol and the Vertratscha/Vrtača. It is located on the border between Slovenia and Austria.

Geography

The massif consisting of main dolomite and Dachstein limestone beds rises between the Slovene Sava valley in the south and the Austrian Drau basin in the north. Its steep northern face, resembling a rocky pyramid with a rounded summit is a landmark in Carinthia.

The mountain is usually climbed from the village of Belca on its Slovenian side.

Name
Mentioned as Copan mons in a 1650 map, the German oronym Mittagskogel (Midday Peak) denotes the position of the sun above the summit at noon. The mountain is also called Jepa in the Carinthian Slovene dialect.

References

External links 

 Kepa on Geopedia

Karawanks
Mountains of the Alps
Mountains of Carinthia (state)
Mountains of Upper Carniola
Two-thousanders of Austria
Two-thousanders of Slovenia